Dr. Samuel Perry House is a historic plantation house located near Gupton, Franklin County, North Carolina.  It was built about 1857, and is a two-story, three bay, four-square Italianate / Greek Revival style frame dwelling.  It is sheathed in weatherboard and has a hipped roof.  It was built by noted American carpenter and builder Jacob W. Holt (1811-1880).

It was listed on the National Register of Historic Places in 1975.

References

Plantation houses in North Carolina
Houses on the National Register of Historic Places in North Carolina
Houses completed in 1857
Greek Revival houses in North Carolina
Italianate architecture in North Carolina
Houses in Franklin County, North Carolina
National Register of Historic Places in Franklin County, North Carolina
1857 establishments in North Carolina